Lupin the Third media franchise was spawned by a Japanese manga written and illustrated by Monkey Punch. It includes several animated television series, television specials, theatrical and home video features as well as further manga titles.

The story follows the adventures of a gang of thieves led by Arsène Lupin III, the grandson of Arsène Lupin, the gentleman thief of Maurice Leblanc's series of novels. Lupin and his gang travel throughout the world to steal treasures and escape from the law.

The first manga was written and illustrated by Monkey Punch. It was serialized by Futabasha in Weekly Manga Action in 94 chapters from August 10, 1967. Additional chapters known as Lupin III New Adventures were released from August 12, 1971. Tokyopop licensed the series for North America, and released all 14 volumes between December 10, 2002 and July 6, 2004. The Tokyopop edition is adapted from the Chuokoron Shinsha edition from 1989. In Europe, the series was licensed by Star Comics in Italy and Ediciones Mangaline in Spain.

Monkey Punch began publishing the second Lupin manga,  in Weekly Manga Action on June 23, 1977 until 1981. Three chapters were published in the British magazine Manga Mania between May and July 1996. Tokyopop licensed the second series, and released the first nine volumes as Lupin III: World's Most Wanted between September 7, 2004 and July 10, 2007. Like the first series, the Tokyopop release was based on the Chuokoron Shinsha edition from 1990. Tokyopop later cancelled the series due to low sales.

A number of other series by other creators have since followed.

On August 27, 2004, Futabasha launched Lupin III Official Magazine, a quarterly publication of Lupin III manga by various authors.

Lupin III

Lupin III: World's Most Wanted
American version of Shin Lupin III. Seventeen volumes were planned, but only nine were released.

Lupin III S

Lupin III Y

Lupin III M
Lupin III M by Yukio Miyama began serialization in 2004.

Lupin M Neo

Lupin III H
Lupin III H by Naoya Hayakawa started in summer 2009. The first volume was released on October 12, 2010 and a ninth was released on February 12, 2016.

Lupin III B
Lupin III B by Tamio Baba was serialized between 2012 and 2013. A collected volume was released on February 28, 2014.

Lupin III: Neighbour World Princess

Spin offs
A number of spin offs focusing on individual characters were also created. Captain Zenigata was first released on September 12, 2011. M.F.C (Mine Fujiko Company) was published as two volumes on September 28, 2009. Goemon Ishikawa XIII by Kazuo Hoshi was released on September 27, 2014.

References

Manga
Lupin the Third